Proverbs 7 is the seventh chapter of the Book of Proverbs in the Hebrew Bible or the Old Testament of the Christian Bible. The book is a compilation of several wisdom literature collections; the heading in 1:1 may be intended to regard Solomon as the traditional author of the whole book, but the dates of the individual collections are difficult to determine, and the book probably obtained its final shape in the post-exilic period. This chapter is a part of the first collection of the book.

Text
The original text is written in Hebrew language. This chapter is divided into 27 verses.

Textual witnesses
Some early manuscripts containing the text of this chapter in Hebrew are of the Masoretic Text, which includes the Aleppo Codex (10th century), and Codex Leningradensis (1008). Fragments containing parts of this chapter in Hebrew were found among the Dead Sea Scrolls including 4Q103 (4QProv; 30 BCE – 30 CE) with extant verses 9, 11.

There is also a translation into Koine Greek known as the Septuagint, made in the last few centuries BC; some extant ancient manuscripts of this version include Codex Vaticanus (B; B; 4th century), Codex Sinaiticus (S; BHK: S; 4th century), and Codex Alexandrinus (A; A; 5th century).

Analysis
This chapter belongs to a section regarded as the first collection in the book of Proverbs (comprising Proverbs 1–9), known as "Didactic discourses". The Jerusalem Bible describes chapters 1–9 as a prologue of the chapters 10–22:16, the so-called "[actual] proverbs of Solomon", as "the body of the book". 
The chapter has the following structure: 
Parental instruction to accept teaching against the wiles of the harlot (adulteress) (verses 1–5)
Example story on the wiles of the harlot (verses 6–23)
Concluding instruction to avoid the harlot (verses 24–27)

The wiles of a harlot (7:1–5)
The appeal for the son to accept the instruction in this section closely echoes 6:20–24. Wisdom is to be treated as a 'sister' (verse 4; cf. a 'bride' in Song 4:9–10), to counter the attraction to the adulteress (cf. Proverbs 4:6–9). It is followed by a story presented in the form of the personal reminiscence of the narrator.

Verse 2
Keep my commandments and live,
and my teaching as the apple of your eye.
This phrase is found in several other places in the Hebrew Bible (Psalm 17:8, Zechariah 2:8). The phrase "has the idea of something precious that was to be guarded jealously", because of the importance of protecting the eye from harm, and can be rendered in a more contemporary wording to be "as your most prized possession."

The crafty harlot (7:6–27)
This section records "an example story on the wiles of the adulteress ... cast in the form of [a] personal reminiscence". The narrator observes a wayward youth through the lattice of his window (in the Septuagint, it is the woman who looks out of the window seeking her prey). This young man was going through darkening streets towards the house of the adulteress (verses 6–9) and there he is accosted by the woman who dressed like a prostitute (verses 10–13) and spoke with 'smoothness' (verses 14–20; cf. verse 5)—the harlot's chief weapon (cf. Proverbs 2:16; 5:3; 6:24). Unable to resist the advances and oblivious to the real cost to pay, the young man follows the harlot like a beast to the slaughter, or a bird caught in her snare (verses  21–23). 
The final paragraph (verses 24–27) reinforces the instruction to avoid the deadly paths of the adulteress or harlot, because her house is "the vestibule to Sheol and leads down to death" (cf. Proverbs 2:18–19; 5:8).

See also

 Related Bible parts: Proverbs 1, Proverbs 2, Proverbs 6, Proverbs 15

Citations

General and cited sources

External links
 Jewish translations:
 Mishlei - Proverbs, Chapter 7 (Judaica Press). translation [with Rashi's commentary], Chabad.
 Christian translations:
 Online Bible, GospelHall (ESV, KJV, Darby, American Standard Version, Bible in Basic English).
 Book of Proverbs, Chapter 7, King James Version, Bible gateway.
 , various versions.

07